The following highways are numbered 17J:

United States
 Nebraska Link 17J
 New York State Route 17J (former)

See also
List of highways numbered 17